Two ships of the United States Navy have borne the name USS Pargo, named in honor of the pargo,  a fish of the genus Lutjanus found in the West Indies.

United States Navy ship names

ja:パーゴ